Ronald Fredrick Powell (born May 14, 1991) is a former American football linebacker . He was drafted by the New Orleans Saints in the fifth round of the 2014 NFL Draft. He played college football at University of Florida.

High school career
A native of Moreno Valley, California, Powell attended Rancho Verde High School, where he played defensive end, linebacker and tight end.  In his senior season, he totaled over 80 tackles, 13 sacks, 28 tackles for losses on defense, while averaging over 15 yards per catch on offense.  He was named a High School All-American by USA Today, Parade, and EA Sports.  He was selected to play in the 2010 U.S. Army All-American Bowl, where he was voted MVP.

Regarded as a five-star college recruit by Rivals.com, Powell was listed as the No. 1 prospect (regardless of position) in the class of 2010.

College career
Powell accepted an athletic scholarship to attend the University of Florida in Gainesville, Florida, where he was a member of coach Urban Meyer and coach Will Muschamp's Florida Gators football teams from 2010 to 2013.  As a freshman in 2010, he played in 13 games and made one start. In his sophomore year, he became a regular starter for the Gators, playing and starting in 12 games. In an injury-plagued junior year, he tore his left ACL two different times, first in the spring Orange and Blue game, and again during rehab. For the 2012 season, he earned a medical redshirt. In 2013, Powell played in 11 games and started in eight.

Professional career

New Orleans Saints
Powell was listed as the 15th ranked OLB and projected to be a 5th round pick in the 2014 NFL Draft. The New Orleans Saints drafted Powell with the 169th pick.  He played in 14 games during the 2014 season.  The Saints released him on September 1, 2015; after he cleared waivers, he was placed on the Saints' injured reserve list.

Chicago Bears
On September 21, 2016, Powell was signed to the Bears' practice squad.

Seattle Seahawks
On December 13, 2016, Powell was signed by the Seahawks off the Bears' practice squad.

On August 10, 2017, Powell was waived/injured by the Seahawks and placed on injured reserve. He was released on August 16, 2017.

Orlando Apollos
In 2018, Powell signed with the Orlando Apollos of the Alliance of American Football for the 2019 season. He was placed on the waived/injured list on January 9, 2019. The league ceased operations in April 2019.

See also
 List of Florida Gators in the NFL Draft

References

External links
Florida Gators bio

1991 births
Living people
People from Moreno Valley, California
Players of American football from California
Sportspeople from Riverside County, California
American football defensive ends
Florida Gators football players
New Orleans Saints players
Tampa Bay Buccaneers players
Chicago Bears players
Seattle Seahawks players
Orlando Apollos players